Women's shinty is a sport, played almost entirely within Scotland, identical to the men's game – with the same rules, same sized pitch and same equipment. It is administered by the Women's Camanachd Association (Camanachd nam Ban)

History
In the 1990s, teams from Glengarry, Oban and Dunaad were beginning to play each other, this resulted in the Women's Camanachd Association being set up in 2001 to run the league and cup system discretely from the men's game.

Competition structure

League
Dunaad, Glengarry and Oban Camancheroes made up the first league.  The league has now expanded to cover most of the major shinty playing areas. As of 2012, these will be known as the Marine Harvest Leagues.

Until 2013, there was a National league one, with teams of 10 a-side, with two regional divisions, based on the sport's traditional North and South Districts, in which teams played 8 a-side.  This however, often led to very small leagues and a lack of games which resulted in stilted growth for the game.

In 2014, the WCA amalgamated the North and South Divisions Two into National Division Two. This, along with the promotion of Skye and Lochaber to National Division One, resulted in two sizeable leagues allowing for more regular play.

National Division One 2014

Glasgow Mid-Argyll
Aberdour
Skye Camanachd
Lochaber
Glengarry
Badenoch & Strathspey

National Division Two 2014

Oban Lorn
Lovat
Ardnamurchan
Glasgow Mid-Argyll†
Strathglass
Dunadd Camanachd
Cowal & Bute

†Denotes reserve team

Cup

Valerie Fraser Trophy – The equivalent of the Camanachd Cup for the women's game. However a club need only win two games to win it.  In order to increase the number of teams competing, Division Two teams were permitted entry in 2012. It has been sponsored by Peter Gow of Inverness for several years.
Challenge Cup – A cup for Division Two and reserve sides. Originally the Caledonian Canal sponsored this tournament, but it will be the Marine Harvest Cup from 2012.

Representative
There are North and South representative games at senior and U-18 level.  These are one of the few 12 a-side games played in the women's game. These are traditionally played in Oban.

International links
There are also international compromise rules games against camogie teams. In recent years the gap with the Irish Camogie sides has been too great and so the Scotland national side now usually face British Universities GAA. In 2013, Scotland faced Dublin Camogie.

See also
Camogie

References

External links
 Official Website of the WCA
 Camanachd Association Women's page

Shinty
Shinty
Women's team sports